The 2022 European Athletics U18 Championships was the third edition of the biennial continental athletics competition for European athletes aged fifteen to seventeen. It was held in Jerusalem, Israel from 4 to 7 July at the Hebrew University Stadium. The event returned after a four-year hiatus since Gyor 2018, because Rieti 2020 was first postponed to 2021 and then cancelled due to the COVID-19 pandemic. A future edition has been awarded to Rieti for 2026.

Medal summary
Legend
  (Championship Record),  (Personal Best; =PB: repeat/reconfirm Personal Best),  (Season Best),  (World U18 Lead),  (World U20 Lead),  (European U18 Lead),  (European U20 Lead),  (National U18 Best Performance/Record)

Men

* Indicates that the athlete participated only in the preliminary heats and also received a medal as part of the relay.

Women

Medal table

Participating nations
957 competitors (477 boys and 480 girls) from 48 countries are expected to compete.

References

External links
 Official web site – jerusalem2022.org.il. Retrieved 10 July 2022.
 Videos and live broadcast – eurovisionsports.tv. Retrieved 10 July 2022.
 U18 Championships Jerusalem 2022, 4-7 July 2022, Givat Ram Stadium –  Statistics Handbook (Results) – European Athletic Association. Retrieved 11 July 2022.
 Daily Schedule - European Athletics U18 Championships (Results) – European Athletic Association, 3 July 2022. Retrieved via web.archive.org on July 10, 2022.
 Records and Medal Standings – European Athletic Association 2022. Retrieved via web.archive.org on July 9, 2022.

European Athletics U18 Championships
International sports competitions hosted by Israel
Sport in Jerusalem
European Youth Athletics Championships
Athletics Youth Championships
European Youth Athletics Championships
European Athletics Youth Championships
2022 in youth sport